A thermal vacuum chamber (TVAC) is a vacuum chamber in which the radiative thermal environment is controlled.

Typically the thermal environment is achieved by passing liquids or fluids through thermal shrouds for cold temperatures or through the application of thermal lamps for high temperatures.

Thermal vacuum chambers are frequently used for testing spacecraft or parts thereof under a simulated space environment.

Examples
Thermal vacuum chambers can be found at:
 NASA's Space Environment Simulation Laboratory at the Johnson Space Center
 NASA's Space Power Facility, Spacecraft Propulsion Research Facility and Cryogenic Propellant Tank Facility (K-Site) at the Glenn Research Center
 NASA's Space Environment Simulator at Goddard Space Flight Center
 NASA's DynaVac 36" T/V Chamber
 The ESA Large Space Simulator

See also
Vacuum engineering

References

Laboratory equipment
Vacuum systems